The Universe for Beginners, republished as Introducing the Universe, is a 1993 graphic study guide to cosmology written by Felix Pirani and illustrated by Christine Roche. The volume, according to the publisher's website, "recounts the revolutions in physics and astronomy," from "Aristotle to Newton," and, "Einstein to Quantum Mechanics," "that underlie the present-day picture of the universe."

Publication history
This volume was originally published in the UK by Icon Books in 1993 as The Universe for Beginners, and subsequently republished with different covers as Introducing the Universe and Introducing the Universe: A Graphic Guide.

Editions:

Related volumes in the series:

Reception
Norwegian philosopher Finngeir Hiorth states that the book, like its companion volume, Stephen Hawking for Beginners, starts with, "historical passages dealing with earlier ideas about the Universe," before, "bringing the story up-to-date." Pirani's text is, according to Hiorth, "written in a simple and easily understandable language with a minimum of formulas," with terminology, "always explained." "[P]rofusely illustrated." by Roche, the volume is, Hiorth concludes, "like comics or funnies," where, "quite a lot of the information is formulated in an entertaining way."

References

Popular physics books
Non-fiction graphic novels
Educational comics
1993 in comics
Cosmology books